The Fueter–Pólya theorem, first proved by Rudolf Fueter and George Pólya, states that the only quadratic polynomial pairing functions are the Cantor polynomials.

Introduction 
In 1873, Georg Cantor showed that the so-called Cantor polynomial

 

The polynomial given by swapping the variables is also a pairing function.

Fueter was investigating whether there are other quadratic polynomials with this property, and concluded that this is not the case assuming . He then wrote to Pólya, who showed the theorem does not require this condition.

Statement 

 

or

Proof 
The original proof is surprisingly difficult, using the Lindemann–Weierstrass theorem to prove the transcendence of
 for a nonzero algebraic number .
In 2002, M. A. Vsemirnov published an elementary proof of this result.

Fueter–Pólya conjecture 
The conjecture is that these are the only such pairing polynomials. In a 2018 preprint, Pieter Adriaans has put forward a proof that purports to confirm the conjecture.

Higher dimensions 

A generalization of the Cantor polynomial in higher dimensions is as follows:

The sum of these binomial coefficients yields a polynomial of degree  in  variables. This is just one of at least  inequivalent packing polynomials for  dimensions.

References 

Mathematical theorems
Number theory